Eastpoint is a census-designated place (CDP) in Franklin County, Florida, United States. The population was 2,337 at the 2010 census.

Geography

Eastpoint is located at  (29.741560, -84.876951).

Demographics

As of the census of 2000, there were 2,158 people, 804 households, and 612 families residing in the CDP. The racial makeup of the CDP was 96.57% White, 0.79% African American, 0.42% Native American, 0.09% Asian, 0.56% from other races, and 1.58% from two or more races. Hispanic or Latino of any race were 1.67% of the population.

There were 804 households, out of which 36.3% had children under the age of 18 living with them, 59.3% were married couples living together, 11.4% had a female householder with no husband present, and 23.8% were non-families. 18.7% of all households were made up of individuals, and 6.8% had someone living alone who was 65 years of age or older.  The average household size was 2.61 and the average family size was 2.95.

In the CDP, the population was spread out, with 26.4% under the age of 18, 7.6% from 18 to 24, 28.0% from 25 to 44, 24.6% from 45 to 64, and 13.5% who were 65 years of age or older.  The median age was 36 years. For every 100 females, there were 99.6 males.  For every 100 females age 18 and over, there were 96.4 males.

The median income for a household in the CDP was $30,324, and the median income for a family was $29,940. Males had a median income of $23,750 versus $25,179 for females. The per capita income for the CDP was $13,382.  About 6.3% of families and 12.1% of the population were below the poverty line, including 17.0% of those under age 18 and 6.7% of those age 65 or over.

Education

Eastpoint is within the Franklin County Schools system. The Franklin County School, a K-12 school, houses the district's elementary, middle and high school programs. It is located in Eastpoint.

Planned Fire 
On June 24, 2018, a controlled fire struck the town of Eastpoint and burned about 1,000 acres in 24 hours. 36 families lost their homes and cleanup has since begun. Families were displaced to the Eastpoint Church of God where the Red Cross took in more than 175 people.

References

Beaches of Franklin County, Florida
Census-designated places in Franklin County, Florida
Census-designated places in Florida
Populated places on the Intracoastal Waterway in Florida
Beaches of Florida